Events from the year 1775 in Denmark.

Incumbents
 Monarch – Christian VII
 Prime minister – Ove Høegh-Guldberg

Events
 1 May – The Royal Danish Porcelain Factory is founded by the chemist Frantz Heinrich Müller, who is given a 50-year monopoly to create porcelain in Denmark, and begins operations in a converted post office.

Undated
 Bygholm Manor is completed near Horsens.
 Vincenzo Galeotti succeeds Vincenzo Piatolli as artistic director of the Royal Danish Ballet.
 Nicolai Abildgaard completes The Wounded Philoctetes.

Births
 27 March – Nicolai Abraham Holten, banker and civil servant (died 1850) 
 12 August  Conrad Malte-Brunm, geographer and journalist (died 1826)
 17 September – Margrethe Schall, dancer (died 1852)
 9 October – Peter Thonning, physician and botanist (died 1848)
 19 October – Kamma Rahbek, salonist and lady of letters (died 1829)
 1 November  Christian Adolph Diriks, lawyer (died 1837)
 8 November –  Jacob Peter Mynster, theologian and bishop (died 1854)

Deaths
 30 March – Christian Ditlev Reventlow, Privy Councillor and nobleman (born 1710)
 16 March Martin Lehmann  Martin Lehmann, engraver (died 1856)
 10 April – Jonas Haas, engraver (born 1720)
 15 June – Joost van Hemert, merchant  and ship-owner (born 1696)
 16 August – Jakob Langebek, historian (born 1710)
 16 October – Peter van Hurk, businessman (born 1697)
 25 November – Jacob Benzon, nobleman, civil servant and Governor-general of Norway (born 1688)

References

 
1770s in Denmark
Denmark
Years of the 18th century in Denmark